Uplawmoor railway station was a railway station serving the village of Uplawmoor, East Renfrewshire, Scotland as part of the Lanarkshire and Ayrshire Railway.

History
The station opened on 1 May 1903. It closed between 1 January 1917 and 2 March 1919 due to wartime economy, and closed permanently to passengers and freight on 2 April 1962. Upon closure, the nearby station  took on the name 'Uplawmoor'.

Although the station was closed to regular passengers, in 1964 the Royal Train was stabled here overnight during a visit to the area by the Queen Mother.

Sidings ran to the Shillford Quarry that was located to the east of the station within Uplawmoor Wood.

References

Notes

Sources

External links
Video footage of Uplawmoor Station ruins

Railway stations in Great Britain opened in 1903
Railway stations in Great Britain closed in 1917
Railway stations in Great Britain opened in 1919
Railway stations in Great Britain closed in 1962
Disused railway stations in East Renfrewshire
Former Caledonian Railway stations